The Circle Brazil (also known as The Circle Brasil in Brazil) is a Brazilian reality competition show, produced by Studio Lambert and Motion Content Group which will be launched on Netflix. It premiered on 11 March 2020 and ended on 25 March as part of a three-week event. Along with The Circle Brazil, Netflix also released separate versions of The Circle in the United States and France. The Circle Brazil will be the first Brazilian reality TV show on Netflix. The show bills itself as a game based around social media, with the concept that "anyone can be anyone in The Circle". It has been compared to Big Brother and Catfish in format.

Marina Gregory won the first season of The Circle Brazil and the  prize that came along with it. Rayssa "Ray" Santos was the runner-up.

Format 
The contestants, or "players", move into the same apartment building. However, the contestants do not meet face-to-face during the course of the competition, as they each live in their own individual apartment. They communicate solely using their profiles on a specially-designed social media app that gives them the ability to portray themselves in any way they choose. Players can thus opt to present themselves as a completely different personality to the other players, a tactic otherwise known as catfishing; for example, one male player in the first season presented himself as a female identity, while another female contestant used photos of a woman she felt was more attractive.

In each episode, the contestants "rate" one another from first to last place. At the end of the ratings, their average ratings are revealed to one another from lowest to highest. Normally, the two highest-rated players become "Influencers", while the remaining players will be at risk of being "blocked" by the Influencers. However, occasionally there may be a twist to the blocking process – varying from the lowest rating players being instantly blocked, the identity of the influencers being a secret, or multiple players being blocked at one time. Blocked players are eliminated from the game, but are given the opportunity to meet one player still in the game in-person. Then, the day after a blocking, a video message is shown to the remaining players to reveal if they were real or fake.

Players 
A total of 14 players were selected from the "20–25 individuals" being cleared to appear on the show, with the remaining people never leaving standby status and not appearing on the show. The players' profiles were revealed as they introduced themselves on-screen during an episode.

Future appearances
After this season, in 2020, JP Gadelha appeared in A Fazenda 12, he finished in 19th place

In 2021, Marina Gregory appeared as original cast member on De Férias com o Ex Brasil: Celebs 2, while in 2022 Gregory appeared on De Férias com o Ex Brasil: Salseiro VIP as an original cast member and compete on All Star Shore winning the game.

Episodes

Background

Concept 
Tim Harcourt is the creative director of Studio Lambert, which produces the British and American versions of the show. Harcourt wondered what a reality show would look like if the people never met face-to-face. He had also been considering the idea of a bird's-eye view-style documentary of an apartment building, seeing into each of their lives. He began to work on The Circle after hearing that Channel 4 was looking for a reality-show format centered on social media.

Development 
The British version of the show premiered in 2018, and was renewed for its second season a few months after the first season ended. After the first season was Channel 4's "youngest profiling" show in six years, according to the British TV industry magazine Broadcast, talks began of international versions. On October 8, 2018, Netflix announced its partnership with All3Media to create three international versions of The Circle on Netflix, including the American version. Brandon Reigg, Netflix's Vice Principal of Unscripted Content, stated, "We think the show's combination of modern social media interaction and competition will captivate Netflix members around the world, in multiple languages, and we're delighted to partner with Studio Lambert and Motion to produce these three new local versions."

Production

Casting 
In an interview with Variety, Tim Harcourt, one of the executive producers for Studio Lambert, stated that The Circle format and premise allowed the casting team to search for all different kinds of people. He noted how the casting contrasted from casts on show like Real Housewives or Jersey Shore and how those shows are "all one gang of quite similar characters." He explained how there was no set cast for the show until it was over. The first eight players to enter were all predetermined and planned, but everything after that was all luck to whoever got on. Harcourt stated that the production team would decide who would be the right fit depending on who just left the game, acknowledging that with thirteen contestants, not all who were possible players end up on the show at all.

The Circle app 
Each apartment that the players live in is plastered with screens in every room in order for the players be able to hold conversations with other players as they go about their everyday lives. Each player starts out the game by creating a profile. This includes sharing their age, relationship status, a short bio, and one photo to use as their profile picture. Every day, the players are allowed to share a status update, explaining their thoughts for the day. Sometimes, either through rewards or passing a certain milestone, the players are allowed to upload another photo to their profile. However, the main purpose of The Circle is to be the only way players can communicate with each other.

At several points during the game, usually every episode, The Circle has the players play a minigame so that they can get to know their fellow players better. Tim Harcourt of Studio Lambert says that "some games were really good for bonding them, some were really good for them learning about each other, some were good for testing who's a catfish, some could have been more divisive."

At certain points during the show, there would be a rating. Players would have to rate each other from first to last by using The Circle and announcing the players they want in each placement. Then, The Circle would average all the placements for each players and create an average for each player. Depending on how high or low their average placement was, the player's ranking would determine if they became in influencer or not. An influencer is usually the two people who get first and second place at the ratings. The influencers would head to the hangout and discuss over The Circle which person to block.

Filming 
The Circle Brazil was filmed in Fall 2019, after the American version's first season and the British version's second season. Filming took place in the same Salford, England apartment building that was used for the American version and second season of the British version.

Apartment building 

As was the same for all versions of The Circle, the first season of The Circle Brazil was shot entirely in an apartment building in Salford, England. The apartment building is always prepared with twelve furnished and ready-to-use apartments for the players to live in. The building also has an exercise room and a rooftop lounge, which are also outfitted with cameras and television screens. One room in the building, called "the testimonial room," is the room players go to after they are blocked to create their goodbye video to the remaining players. On the outside of the building is a large, lit up circle made of a roughly 82-foot (25-meter) diameter aluminum track with LED lights strung through and around the circle.

Opposite the apartment building was the control room, which was previously a college campus that became disused. At any time in the control room, there were between twenty and thirty producers and camera operators working, recording, and sending all the messages from The Circle.

Release 
On 27 January 2020, a teaser for the Brazilian version was released, revealing the premiere date to be 11 March 2020. Then, on 27 February, Netflix released the trailer for the first season, revealing the prize amount to be .

Results and elimination

Notes

References

External links
 
 @thecirclebr on Instagram

2020 Brazilian television series debuts
Brazilian reality television series
Portuguese-language Netflix original programming
The Circle (franchise)
Television series about social media